"You'll Think of Me" is a song by Elvis Presley from his 1969 double album From Memphis to Vegas / From Vegas to Memphis.

Its first release on record was in August or September 1969 on a single as the reverse side to "Suspicious Minds". On December 1, 1970, the single "Suspicious Minds" / "You'll Think of Me" was re-released as part of RCA Victor's Gold Standard Series (together with 9 older Presley's singles).

The single "Suspicious Minds" was certified Gold by RIAA for sales in 1 million copies in the United States on October 28, 1969. On March 27, 1992, it was certified Platinum. It also was the South African single of the year.

Writing and recording history 
The song was written by Mort Shuman.

Presley recorded it on January 14, 1969, at the American Sound Studio in Memphis, Tennessee (at studio sessions for RCA that were held there on January 13–16 and 20–23).

Critical reception 
Robert Matthew-Walker writes in his book Heartbreak Hotel: the Life and Music of Elvis Presley:

Track listings 
7" single (RCA 47–9764)
7" single (RCA Victor 49.623, France, 1969)
7" single (A|B RCA Victor N 1588, Italy, 1969)
7" single (RCA SS-1913, Japan, 1969)
7" single (RCA Victor 3–10436, Spain, 1969)
7" single (RCA Victor PB 1103, France, 1977)
7" single (RCA Victor RCA-2712, Canada, 1978)
 "Suspicious Minds" (4:22)
 "You'll Think of Me" (4:02)
 		 	 
7" EP Suspicious Minds  (RCA Victor TP-510, Portugal, 1969)
 "Suspicious Minds"
 "Known Only to Him"
 "You'll Think of Me"
 "Joshua Fit The Battle"

CD single "Suspicious Minds"  (RCA Victor 0886971223729, Sony BMG, EAN 0886971223729, 10 August 2007)
 "Suspicious Minds" (4:22)
 "You'll Think of Me" (4:02)
 "Suspicious Minds (Alt. Take 7)"

References

External links 
 Elvis Presley – Suspicious Minds / You'll Think Of Me at Discogs

1969 songs
1969 singles
Elvis Presley songs
Songs with music by Mort Shuman